Dianjun District is a district of the city of Yichang, Hubei, People's Republic of China. In 2004 it had 105,175 residents.

The district is located on the right (southwestern) bank of the Yangtze, opposite the Yichang City center (which, administratively, forms Xiling District).

Administrative divisions
Dianjun District is made up of one subdistrict, two towns and two townships. 

The only subdistrict is Dianjun Subdistrict

Two towns:
Aijia, Qiaobian

Two townships:
Lianpeng Township, Tucheng Township

Transportation
Dianjun District is connected to Yichang's Xiling District by the Yiling Bridge (which carries Provincial Highway 323) and a railway bridge (which carries the Yichang-Wanzhou Railway).

Dianjun is served by the freight-only Yichang South Railway Station on the Yichang-Wanzhou Railway.

References

County-level divisions of Hubei
Geography of Yichang